Michael Eugene Costigan (born 1931 in Melbourne) is an Australian Roman Catholic writer, editor, former priest, senior public servant and social justice advocate. 
Michael Costigan was a priest reporter at the Second Vatican Council (1962–65), in his role as a priest-journalist editing the Melbourne weekly Catholic newspaper, The Advocate. Costigan was the first Director of the Literature Board of the Australia Council for the Arts, a position he held from 1973 to 1983. After a time as Secretary of the Ethnic Affairs Commission of New South Wales he became Executive Secretary of the Australian Catholic Bishops' Committee for Justice, Development & Peace.

Early years
Michael Costigan, the twin brother of Royal Commissioner Frank Costigan, and older brother of Lord Mayor of Melbourne, Peter Costigan, was born in Preston, Melbourne into a devout Catholic family. He was the third of eight children. He was educated by the Good Samaritan Sisters in Preston (1936–41).
He attended St Patrick's College, East Melbourne, a school run by the Jesuits who required their students to reach a high standard of learning.  In his Matriculation year he was Dux of the School and the winner of two Exhibitions awarded to Victorian matriculants. As a young Catholic he was involved in the YCW (the Young Christian Workers) and in the post-war revival of the Campion Society, an organisation of lay Catholic activists.

Priestly Studies and Ordination
In 1949 he enrolled in the catholic seminary, Corpus Christi College, Werribee in Victoria to study for the priesthood. In his time at Werribee he wrote articles for a number of Catholic journals and general publications.
In 1952 he was chosen by Archbishop Daniel Mannix of Melbourne to continue his studies for the priesthood in Rome at Propaganda Fide College and its neighbouring Pontifical Urban University. He was ordained a priest in 1955. He completed his doctorate “summa cum laude” in Civil and Canon Law at the Pontifical Lateran University (1956–61).

Return to Melbourne: Editor of the Advocate
In November 1961, after completing nine years of study in Rome, Costigan was appointed associate editor of the weekly newspaper The Advocate by Archbishop Daniel Mannix. His editorship continued under Archbishop Justin Simonds and Archbishop (later Cardinal) James Knox.

As a priest and journalist he spent most of the next eight years reporting on the Second Vatican Council for The Advocate. 
In 1963 he returned to Rome to report on the Council first hand. In the following years there followed many interviews, articles, lectures and keynote speeches usually on the subject of the council. The author and commentator Edmund Campion states that the paper's coverage by and under Costigan "gave a more thorough day-by-day account of the Council than any other English language diocesan weekly.”
In the turmoil of the 1960s, as a somewhat fearless journalist and writer, Costigan took controversial stances on the National Civic Council under B.A. Santamaria; the sending of Australian conscripts to the Vietnam War; coverage of the worldwide anti-war movement; the Victorian Government's banning of Mary McCarthy’s book, The Group; the hanging of Ronald Ryan (1967); Christian-Marxist dialogue; the challenging theology of the Jesuit paleontologist Pierre Teilhard de Chardin; and the encyclical Humanae Vitae (1968) which told Catholics they still could not practise artificial birth control.

After the priesthood: the Sunday Observer
Costigan left the priesthood in 1969.  He gained a position on the late Gordon Barton’s Sunday Observer (Victoria's first Sunday newspaper, edited initially by the writer Michael Cannon - late 1969).  His articles included topics such as the ordination of women; the formation of the National Council of Priests; Pope Paul VI’s visit to Sydney (1970); one of the first visits of Mother Teresa to Australia; the collapse of Melbourne's West Gate Bridge; the discovery in Melbourne of the Great Train Robber Ronald Biggs and his escape to South America; and the controversial return to Australia of the communist journalist Wilfred Burchett.

Sunday Review: Nation Review 
After the collapse in 1970 of his Sunday Observer, Gordon Barton transferred Michael Costigan to the staff of his newly created weekly The Sunday Review, later renamed Nation Review, at first under Cannon's editorship and soon that of the Australian publisher Richard Walsh. Costigan found this a stimulating period:
There my education was much improved by fellow staff members like Walsh himself, the cartoonist Michael Leunig (with whom I shared an office for two years), Mike Morris , the Victorian Government Minister Ian Baker, the late John Hepworth and the late Richard Beckett, alias Sam Orr, a restaurant reviewer ... colourful columnists, contributors and book reviewers. They included two other politicians-in-waiting, Barry Jones and Tom Roper, as well as Mungo MacCallum, Barry Humphries, Germaine Greer, Bob Ellis, Beatrice Faust, Phillip Adams, Morris Lurie, the late Penny Harding, Edward Kynaston (my eventual successor as literary editor), Francis James, the late Max Teichmann and the late Owen Webster and Henry Schoenheimer (both of whom tragically suicided in that period).

During the same period Michael Costigan also wrote for Edmund Campion's Catholic-oriented fortnightly newsletter Report : Says Campion of his writers:
Of them all, Michael Costigan was outstanding ... Costigan’s column was distinguished not only because he had an acute journalistic talent but, more, because he knew what the big picture was all about. His overview of history and his intellectual penetration enabled him to see the significance of apparently quotidian happenings. His column would have shone in any publication. In ours it blazed.

Eucharistic Congress: Literature Board of the Australia Council
After a year working on leave from Nation Review as a media organiser and writer for Melbourne's International Eucharistic Congress (1973) Costigan took up the Whitlam government's invitation to become the founding Director of the Literature Board of the newly founded Australia Council for the Arts, later renamed the Australia Council. This was a position he held for ten years (1973 to 1983). On his initial Board of Directors were Geoffrey Blainey (Chairman), A.D. Hope, Manning Clark, Geoffrey Dutton, David Malouf, Richard Hall, Nancy Keesing, Judah Waten, Elizabeth Riddell, Thomas Shapcott and Richard Walsh.

Western Australian Arts Council: NSW Ethnic Affairs Commission

After serving for a decade as a Commonwealth public servant, Costigan accepted two other short-term appointments at State level, also in a senior capacity.  The first, in Perth, under the newly elected Government of Premier Brian Burke, was as Director of the Western Australian Arts Council (1983–85). The second, back in Sydney under the Wran Government, at the invitation of the President of the Ethnic Affairs Commission of New South Wales, Dr Paolo Totaro, as that organisation's first appointed Secretary (1985–87).

Bishops Committee for Justice, Development and Peace
In October 1987 Michael Costigan took leave from the public service and accepted an offer from the Australian Catholic Bishops Conference to take the newly created position of Executive Secretary to the Bishops Committee for Justice, Development and Peace (BCJDP). After deciding not to return to the public service, he was to hold the Church position for almost 18 years, until his retirement (1987 to 2005).

Part-time Appointments: Retirement Activities

Both before and after retirement Dr Costigan continued to write, as a freelance journalist and specialist book reviewer, for a variety of publications, mostly Catholic and social justice-related in nature. They have included the Sydney Catholic Weekly, the quarterly journal of the National Council of Priests (The Swag), the Brisbane Catholic Leader and the annual Journal of the Australian Catholic Historical Society. As a founding member in 1966 of the Australasian Canon Law Society, he delivered a 13,000-word paper on his reminiscences to that Society's 50th anniversary annual conference in Surfers Paradise on 7 September 2016. It was published in the Proceedings of the conference. His background in law studies was recognised by his appointments as a lay member of the NSW Legal Profession Standards Board (1988–94) and of the NSW Legal Services Tribunal (1994-2015).

He has continued to give occasional talks, most of them later published by the inviting group, on the Second Vatican Council and its consequences. In light of his literary qualifications, the Australian Nobel Prize-winning author Patrick White appointed Costigan in 1988 to the three-member panel judging the annual Patrick White Literary Award. After White's death in 1990 he remained on the panel until 2015, chairing it in the final five years of his membership.

Two of Michael Costigan's ex officio appointments while employed were his memberships from 1987 to 2005 of the National Committee of Caritas Australia and the Australian Catholic Social Justice Council, which, together with Catholic Earthcare Australia some years afterwards, he had helped to create.

After his retirement in 2005, Costigan was appointed an honorary Adjunct Professor of Australian Catholic University, with which he had previously had fruitful dealings while working for the Australian Bishops. He maintains a close relationship with that university's Theology and Philosophy Department. From 2005 until 2016 he was a member of and for a time chaired the Sydney Archdiocesan Advisory Committee on Social Justice. He has also had frequent productive associations with entities interested in Catholic Church renewal or reform, including Catalyst for Renewal.

Dr Costigan has been honoured by the award of Life Memberships of the New South Wales Fellowship of Australian Writers and the Australasian Catholic Press Association.

References

1931 births
Australian journalists
Roman Catholic writers
Australian Roman Catholics
Living people
People from Preston, Victoria
Clergy from Melbourne
Writers from Melbourne
Public servants from Melbourne
Australian twins
Australian people of Irish descent